Arif Nizami (Punjabi, ; 14 October 1948 – 21 July 2021) was a Pakistani journalist and caretaker federal minister who was the founder of the Pakistan Today.

Previously, he had been an editor of The Nation and had served as Minister of Information and Postal Service in the Khoso caretaker ministry.

Early life
Nizami was born to Hameed Nizami in Lahore, the founder of Nawa-i-Waqt Group of newspapers.

Career
He left The Nation and Nawa-i-Waqt in 2009 due to personal disagreements with his uncle, the late Majid Nizami who was the managing director and Chief Executive at the family-owned newspapers at that time, whereas Arif Nizami was a part-owner and a director of the company.

In 2010, he founded Pakistan Today newspaper and served as editor of the newspaper.

In 2013, he was made caretaker minister for Information and Postal Service.

In 2015, Arif Nizami became CEO of Channel 24. He was also the host of a political talk show "Debate News Analysis". Arif Nizami is also known for previously hosting a current affairs show on Samaa TV. He was also a guest in 92 News Talk Show program "Ho Kya Raha Hai".

Death 
Arif Nizami died on Wednesday 21 July 2021 at the age of 72. Arif Nizami had suffered from a heart attack around 1 July and was admitted to a private hospital in Lahore.

References

1948 births
2021 deaths
Pakistani male journalists
Pakistani newspaper editors
Pakistani media personalities
Pakistani newspaper founders
Punjabi people
Journalists from Lahore
Federal ministers of Pakistan
Pakistanis named in the Pandora Papers